Mohammad Shafiq (died 5 February 2020) was a Pakistani politician from Gilgit-Baltistan belonging to Pakistan Muslim League (N). He was a member of the  Gilgit-Baltistan Legislative Assembly. He was a minister of the Government of Gilgit-Baltistan too.

Biography
Shafiq was elected as a legislator of the Gilgit-Baltistan Legislative Assembly from Ghanche-III in 2015. He also served as the mines and minerals, industries, labour & commerce and food minister of the Government of Gilgit-Baltistan.

Shafiq died of cardiac arrest in Islamabad on 5 February 2020.

References

Year of birth missing
2020 deaths
Gilgit-Baltistan MLAs 2015–2020
Pakistan Muslim League (N) politicians
People from Ghanche District